Happy Anniversary, Charlie Brown! is a 1989 album commemorating the 40th anniversary of the comic strip Peanuts and released by GRP Records.  The album contains versions of music and songs from the TV specials, as well as some original compositions, performed by various jazz artists such as Dave Brubeck, David Benoit, Dave Grusin, Lee Ritenour and Kenny G. The album was released to coincide with the TV documentary You Don't Look 40, Charlie Brown.

Track listing

Voices
 Charlie Brown: Kaleb Henley
 Linus: Brandon Stewart
 Lucy: Jennifer Banko
 Peppermint Patty: Nichole Buda

References

1989 albums
Peanuts music
GRP Records albums
Albums produced by Mike Abene
Vince Guaraldi tribute albums